Mill Village is a borough in Erie County, Pennsylvania, United States. The population was 394 at the 2020 census, down from 412 during the 2010 census. It is part of the Erie Metropolitan Statistical Area.

Geography
Mill Village is located in southern Erie County at  (41.876050, -79.972607). It is surrounded by LeBoeuf Township. U.S. Route 6 passes through the borough, leading east  to Union City and southwest  to Cambridge Springs.

It sits on the eastern edge of the valley of French Creek, part of the Allegheny River watershed.

Demographics

As of the census of 2000, there were 412 people, 149 households, and 116 families residing in the borough. The population density was 452.6 people per square mile (174.8/km²). There were 162 housing units at an average density of 177.9 per square mile (68.7/km²). The racial makeup of the borough was 98.30% White, 0.24% African American, 0.97% from other races, and 0.49% from two or more races.

There were 149 households, out of which 38.3% had children under the age of 18 living with them, 66.4% were married couples living together, 5.4% had a female householder with no husband present, and 21.5% were non-families. 17.4% of all households were made up of individuals, and 8.7% had someone living alone who was 65 years of age or older. The average household size was 2.77 and the average family size was 3.11.

In the borough the population was spread out, with 29.9% under the age of 18, 6.8% from 18 to 24, 27.9% from 25 to 44, 23.5% from 45 to 64, and 11.9% who were 65 years of age or older. The median age was 37 years. For every 100 females there were 104.0 males. For every 100 females age 18 and over, there were 100.7 males.

The median income for a household in the borough was $34,375, and the median income for a family was $35,156. Males had a median income of $24,444 versus $20,625 for females. The per capita income for the borough was $12,529. About 7.2% of families and 9.4% of the population were below the poverty line, including 9.9% of those under age 18 and 12.2% of those age 65 or over.

References

External links
Mill Village official website

Populated places established in 1870
Boroughs in Erie County, Pennsylvania
1870 establishments in Pennsylvania